Fendalton is a former New Zealand parliamentary electorate. It existed during two periods between 1946 and 1996. The electorate was in the western suburbs of Christchurch, New Zealand. Fendalton is an expensive suburb, and was always represented by the National Party.

Population centres
The 1941 New Zealand census had been postponed due to World War II, so the 1946 electoral redistribution had to take ten years of population growth and movements into account. The North Island gained a further two electorates from the South Island due to faster population growth. The abolition of the country quota through the Electoral Amendment Act, 1945 reduced the number and increased the size of rural electorates. None of the existing electorates remained unchanged, 27 electorates were abolished, eight former electorates were re-established, and 19 electorates were created for the first time, including Fendalton. To the west of the Main North Line, its area came from the  electorate.

In the 1952 electoral redistribution, the Fendalton electorate expanded to the north and north-west, gaining area from the  electorate, and lost some area in the southern part of the central city. In the 1957 electoral redistribution, the boundaries were adjusted significantly. The southern part of the Fendalton electorate was lost to the  electorate. In the southwest, large areas were transferred to the Riccarton electorate. In the north-west, the electorate was extended as far as Harewood. In the north-east, Papanui was gained from the  electorate. In the 1962 electoral redistribution, some boundary adjustments were carried out in the Papanui area.

Through an amendment in the Electoral Act in 1965, the number of electorates in the South Island was fixed at 25, an increase of one since the 1962 electoral redistribution. It was accepted that through the more rapid population growth in the North Island, the number of its electorates would continue to increase, and to keep proportionality, three new electorates were allowed for in the 1967 electoral redistribution for the next election. In the North Island, five electorates were newly created and one electorate was reconstituted while three electorates were abolished. In the South Island, three electorates were newly created and one electorate was reconstituted while three electorates were abolished (including Fendalton). The overall effect of the required changes was highly disruptive to existing electorates, with all but three electorates having their boundaries altered.

History
Sidney Holland was the electorate's first representative. Holland had since the  held the Christchurch North electorate. He was Prime Minister from 1949 to 1957 while representing the electorate. He retired from Parliament in 1957 due to declining health.

Watts had since  represented various Christchurch electorates. He retired at the end of the parliamentary term in 1960.

The electorate was abolished in 1969, when Eric Holland went to the nearby Riccarton electorate. It was then recreated in 1978, and abolished in 1996, for the first MMP election.

Members of Parliament
The Fendalton electorate was represented by five Members of Parliament:

Key

Election results

1993 election

1990 election

1987 election

1984 election

1981 election

1978 election

1967 by-election

1966 election

1963 election

1960 election

1957 election

1954 election

1951 election

1949 election

1946 election

Notes

References

1946 establishments in New Zealand
1996 disestablishments in New Zealand
Historical electorates of New Zealand
Politics of Christchurch
History of Christchurch
1969 disestablishments in New Zealand
1978 establishments in New Zealand